Étienne Aubry (1746–1781) was a French painter.

Aubry was born in Versailles.  He studied under J. A. Silvestre and Joseph Vien, and soon became noted for his portraits and genre subjects. He exhibited several works of great merit at the Salon; but his life was cut short in its prime, in which year (1781) he had exhibited the 'Parting of Coriolanus from his Wife.'

Works

References

Attribution:
 

18th-century French painters
French male painters
1746 births
1781 deaths
Artists from Versailles
18th-century French male artists